My Fire! (subtitled More of the Psychedelic Soul Jazz Guitar of Joe Jones) is the second album by guitarist Joe Jones which was recorded in 1968 and released on the Prestige label.

Track listing 
All compositions by Joe Jones except noted
 "Light My Fire" (Jim Morrison, Robby Krieger, Ray Manzarek, John Densmore) - 3:54
 "For Big Hal (Harold Mabern) - 7:04
 "St. James Infirmary" (Traditional) - 5:23
 "Take All" (Lloyd Price) - 3:50
 "Time After Time" (Jule Styne, Sammy Cahn) - 7:19
 "Ivan the Terrible" - 5:56

Personnel 
Joe Jones - guitar
Harold Mabern - piano
Peck Morrison - bass
Bill English - drums
Richie "Pablo" Landrum - congas

References 

Boogaloo Joe Jones albums
1969 albums
Prestige Records albums
Albums recorded at Van Gelder Studio
Albums produced by Bob Porter (record producer)